Jean-David Blanc (born 1968) is a French entrepreneur, founder of AlloCiné, business angel, film producer, writer and jazz musician.

Life and career
Blanc was born into a family of musicians; his father is the violinist Serge Blanc and his mother is a music teacher. His father was of Romanian-Jewish descent. His younger brother, Emmanuel Blanc, is a violist with the Orchestre National de France. Blanc started his career in eBusiness from a young age. At the age of 13, he designed video games for the Apple II and published articles in computer publications. At 15, he and Jean Marc Royer created Futura, a bulletin board system. Blanc founded his first IT services company, Crystal Technologies, and introduced the first electronic information service supported on Minitel for the Marlboro Racing Service the following year. At 17, he established his first company, Concerto Telematique, which provided interactive Minitel and phone services to brands such as Marlboro, Nissan, Elf and Coca-Cola. At the age of 22, he had the idea of AlloCiné, a telephone and web-based film ticketing service, and launched the company with Patrick Holzman in 1993. After ten years as CEO and developing AlloCiné, Blanc sold the company to Vivendi Universal in 2001.

After AlloCiné, Blanc has become an active business angel, consultant and strategic advisor for groups and venture capitals related to the internet and new technologies in Europe and the US. He has invested in start-ups such as Appsfire, Square Inc., TheCools, Meetic, and Véoprint. In addition, he mentors and sponsors the startup program at the SUPdeWEB school in Paris.

In June 2015, Jean-David Blanc launches with Pierre Lescure and members of the prime AlloCiné team, a new online TV service called Molotov.

In 2016 he was publicly accused by former partner Melissa George of physical assault against herself, which led to the termination of the relationship. Jean-David Blanc, who has always rejected Melissa George accusations, was declared innocent on 5 February 2021, while Melissa George was sentenced by the criminal courts on 5 September 2019 for using false affidavits in courts, on 9 February 2017 and 5 February 2021 for domestic violence, on 13 June 2018 and 4 November 2021 for defamation and on 10 November 2021 to a 6-month suspended prison sentence for the attempted child abduction of 13 September 2016.

Other works and professional activities
Blanc has been a musician from a young age. He studied harmony and improvisation with the pedagogue Robert Kaddouch, and studied jazz piano at the American School of Modern Music in Paris, France. 
He has worked with actors and directors on different films and projects, and produced the 2005 film, Cavalcade.
In 2012, Blanc authored his first book, Three Days in Nepal, which recounted Blanc's experience of a 2011 paramotoring accident that left him trapped in the mountains of Nepal.

References

1968 births
French businesspeople
French film producers
French jazz musicians
Place of birth missing (living people)
Living people
French male writers